BootX is the name of a graphical bootloader developed by Benjamin Herrenschmidt, which runs as an application or an extension to Mac OS 8 and 9 that allows Old World Apple computers to boot Linux. It is no longer maintained by its original author, as it does not work with any current hardware, but it is still available, and further development may be possible. It is one of three Linux bootloaders which may be used on most Old World Apple computers, the others being miBoot (included, but also independently enhanced by Jeff Carr of LinuxPPC, Inc.), and quik. New World Macs use a different bootloader, yaboot, for booting Linux.

External links 
The BootX Bootloader at penguinppc.org

Boot loaders